The Amiga 3000UX is a model of the Amiga computer family that was released with Amiga Unix, a full port of AT&T Unix System V Release 4 (SVR4), installed along with AmigaOS. The system is otherwise equivalent to the standard A3000, once a right-click initiates a boot to Kickstart (Amiga's kernel).

At one point, Sun Microsystems approached Commodore-Amiga, Inc. with the offer to produce the A3000UX under license as a low- to mid-range alternative to their high-end Sun workstations.  The fact that this offer was declined was one of the many management decisions that led to the popular belief that the Amiga platform would have been a real success story were it not for Commodore management.

It is possible that Commodore (or a third party) repurposed A3000UX machines for standard AmigaOS, as some standard A3000 models have been found with labeling suggesting they were originally to be sold as A3000UX machines.

See also

 Amiga models and variants

References

Amiga